Disaster Informatics or crisis informatics is the study of the use of information and technology in the preparation, mitigation, response and recovery phases of disasters and other emergencies. It began to emerge as a field after the successful use of a variety of technologies in disasters including the Asian tsunami, September 11th and Hurricane Katrina.

Disaster informatics may involve incorporating social media content generated by people in disaster zones into humanitarian response plans based on satellite imagery and official emergency services procedures. Disaster informatics may involve crowdsourcing, participatory mapping or citizen science, with  members of the public as 'everyday analysts'.

History

The term was first used in a request for proposal response by D. E. Yarrington after the WTC communications problems were revealed. Subsequently, in 2002, a grant proposal was submitted to the National Institutes of Health/National Library of Medicine to begin the formal study of disaster informatics as it related to public health. This initiative emerged from her library and information science work at Jackson State University.

See also
 ISCRAM

References

External links
 Crisis Informatics - University of Colorado

Disaster management tools
Disaster preparedness
Information science by discipline